Abancourt may refer to:

 Abancourt, Nord, a commune of the Nord département in France
 Abancourt, Oise, a commune of the Oise département in France

See also
 Aboncourt (disambiguation)